Armstrong Knitting Factory is a historic silk mill located at Charlottesville, Virginia. It was built in 1889, and is a two-story, 11 bay, rectangular brick building with a low hipped roof. It has a central entrance tower with a mansard roof in the Second Empire style.

It was listed on the National Register of Historic Places in 1982.

References

Industrial buildings and structures on the National Register of Historic Places in Virginia
Industrial buildings completed in 1889
Second Empire architecture in Virginia
Buildings and structures in Charlottesville, Virginia
National Register of Historic Places in Charlottesville, Virginia
Textile mills in Virginia
Silk mills in the United States